Santiago Mariño Caribbean International Airport is an airport  west-southwest of Porlamar, the largest city on Isla Margarita, an island in the state of Nueva Esparta in Venezuela.

Facilities

The airport has one terminal, which is divided into international and domestic sections.

Airlines and destinations

Passenger

International service

According to the Official Airline Guide (OAG), the airport had scheduled passenger airline service from Europe and the U.S. during the early 1990s including nonstop flights from Frankfurt, London, Miami, Milan and New York City operated by VIASA. Additionally, several European and Canadian carriers, such as Condor, LTU (merged with Air Berlin in 2009), TUI Airways, TUI fly Netherlands, TUI fly Nordic, Martinair, Air Canada, and Air Transat, among others, had seasonal and charter services to Porlamar in the 1990s and 2000s. Long-haul operations from the airport have since largely ended (except, as of 2023, for a Nordwind Airlines charter flight to Moscow), but short and medium haul international flight still exist as of today. From autumn 2023 LOT Polish Airlines will operate charter flights from Warsaw.

See also
 Transport in Venezuela
 List of airports in Venezuela

References

External links
 
 
 

Airports in Venezuela
Buildings and structures in Nueva Esparta
Porlamar